Roger Dahi (born 7 December 1961) is a sport shooter who has twice represented Syria at the Summer Olympics.

At the 2004 Summer Olympics in Athens he participated in the men's skeet event, finishing in 41st, and last, position. At the 2008 Games in Beijing he again finished last of the 41 athletes in the men's skeet.

References

1961 births
Living people
Syrian male sport shooters
Skeet shooters
Olympic shooters of Syria
Shooters at the 2004 Summer Olympics
Shooters at the 2008 Summer Olympics
Shooters at the 2006 Asian Games
Asian Games competitors for Syria
Sportspeople from Damascus